Bardhaman is  a city in West Bengal.

Bardhaman or Burdwan or Barddhaman may also refer to:

Burdwan division, West Bengal
Bardhaman district, West Bengal
Bardhaman Sadar North subdivision, West Bengal
Bardhaman Sadar South subdivision, West Bengal
Burdwan I, community development block, West Bengal
Burdwan II, community development block, West Bengal
Bardhamanbhukti, an ancient and medieval region/ territory
Bardhaman Raj, a zamindari estate that flourished from about 1657 to 1955
Bardhaman-Durgapur (Lok Sabha constituency), West Bengal
Bardhaman Purba  (Lok Sabha constituency), in West Bengal
Burdwan (Lok Sabha constituency), West Bengal, defunct from 2009
Bardhaman Uttar  (Vidhan Sabha constituency) (earlier called Burdwan North), West Bengal
Bardhaman Dakshin  (Vidhan Sabha constituency) (earlier called Burdwan South), West Bengal